The ALe 801/940 are a series of EMUs built in the 1970s for the Italian state railway FS, now used by its successor, Trenitalia.

Description 
The ALe 801/940 are usually run in 4 car trains, with a power car at each end (ALe 801 and ALe 940) and two trailers (Le 108) in the middle.

History 
In the early 1970s, Ferrovie dello Stato decided to improve the rolling stock for its commuter rail services.

As chopper technology was at that time only at a prototype-state (with the so-called ″Treni GAI″), FS decided to order EMUs with traditional electric equipment. The ALe 801/940 were ordered in 1973, as an evolution of the older ALe 803, with better capacity and acceleration.

These trains were delivered between 1975 and 1979 and put into service around the larger cities of Italy.

Originally painted in a showy orange and yellow livery, that gave them the nickname of "Arancia Meccanica" (Italian title of the movie "A Clockwork Orange," in the late 1990s they received the new ″XMPR-livery,″ based on green and blue tones.

Bibliography 
 Giovanni Cornolò, Automotrici elettriche dalle origini al 1983. Duegi Editrice, 2011 (reprint of 1985). P. 249–260.

External links 

ALe 801 940
Breda multiple units
Railway locomotives introduced in 1975
3000 V DC multiple units